Parliamentary elections were held in Uruguay on 28 November 1910 to elect all members of the Chamber of Representatives. The main opposition, the National Party did not contest the elections.

Electoral system
The elections were the first held after the introduction of the double simultaneous vote system under law 3640.

Suffrage was limited to literate men. Voting was not secret, as voters had to sign their ballot paper.

Results

Aftermath
Following the elections, members of parliament elected José Batlle y Ordóñez as president on 1 March 1911.

References

Uruguay
Parliamentary
Elections in Uruguay
Election and referendum articles with incomplete results